Darur  is a village in the southern state of Karnataka, India. It is located in the Athani Taluk of Belagavi district in Karnataka.

Demographics
 India census, Darur had a population of 5,244 with 2,669 males and 2,575 females. The village is well known by Krishna River and its flood prone area, historically this is famous for agriculture and animal husbandry.

Agriculture
Agriculture is the main source of economy. Now the village is known for commercial crops such as, sugar cane, cotton, sunflower, and traditional crops like maize, soybean, rice, and wheat.

See also

 Belgaum
 Districts of Karnataka

References

External links
 http://Belgaum.nic.in/

Villages in Belagavi district